The tenth season of the American comedy television series It's Always Sunny in Philadelphia premiered on FXX on January 14, 2015. The season consists of 10 episodes and concluded on March 18, 2015. The tenth season was released on DVD in region 1 on January 5, 2016.

Cast

Main cast
 Charlie Day as Charlie Kelly
 Glenn Howerton as Dennis Reynolds
 Rob McElhenney as Mac
 Kaitlin Olson as Dee Reynolds
 Danny DeVito as Frank Reynolds

Recurring cast
 Mary Elizabeth Ellis as The Waitress
 David Hornsby as Cricket
 Lance Barber as Bill Ponderosa
 Catherine Reitman as Maureen Ponderosa
 Lynne Marie Stewart as Bonnie
 Sandy Martin as Mrs. Mac
 Gregory Scott Cummins as Luther Mac
 Michael Naughton as The Waiter

Guest stars
 Wade Boggs as Wade Boggs
 Allison Munn as Kelly
 Dominic Burgess as Psycho Pete
 Keegan-Michael Key as Grant Anderson
 Anna Maria Horsford as Janet Barrett
 Dax Shepard as JoJo

Production
The series was renewed for a tenth season (along with its ninth season) on March 28, 2013, and was announced the series would move from FX to its sister channel FXX. The season was originally scheduled to premiere in fall 2014, but was delayed until January 2015. Glenn Howerton said in July 2013 that the series was planned to end after ten seasons, but it was renewed for an 11th and 12th season in April 2014. JD Harmeyer guest-directed a scene in the episode "The Gang Group Dates".

Episodes

Reception
The tenth season received positive reviews. On Rotten Tomatoes, it has an approval rating of 100% with an average score of 7.9 out of 10 based on 14 reviews. The website's critical consensus reads, "Always Sunny shows no signs of dimming after a decade on the air, refusing to let its status as a television mainstay give it any sheen of respectability as the Gang continues to torment each other for viewers' enjoyment."

Home media

References

External links

 
 

2015 American television seasons
It's Always Sunny in Philadelphia